The Drama Desk Award is an annual prize recognizing excellence in New York theatre. First bestowed in 1955 as the Vernon Rice Award, the prize initially honored Off-Broadway productions, as well as Off-off-Broadway, and those in the vicinity. Following the 1964 renaming as the Drama Desk Awards, Broadway productions were included beginning with the 1968–69 award season. The awards are considered a significant American theater distinction.

History
The Drama Desk organization was formed in 1949 by a group of New York theater critics, editors, reporters and publishers, in order to make the public aware of the vital issues concerning the theatrical industry. They debuted the presentations of the Vernon Rice Awards. The name honors the New York Post critic Vernon Rice, who had pioneered Off-Broadway coverage in the New York press. The name was changed for the 1963–1964 awards season to the Drama Desk Awards.

In 1974, the Drama Desk became incorporated as a not-for-profit organization. In 1975, the Drama Desk announcement of winners included the nominees as well.

The Drama Desk has more than 100 members, including theatre critics, reporters and editors who cover New York theater and vote on the awards. Membership consists of two categories: active (voting) membership and participating membership.

All of the Drama Desk officers and nominating committee members perform their various services for the organization on a voluntary basis. The nominating committee generally meets twice a month to discuss the many eligible shows members are responsible for seeing. They then nominate the productions on which the entire membership will vote. What sets the organization apart is that the awards are voted on "by media people only without any vested interests in the results", according to the organization.

Previous winners include Bernadette Peters, Dustin Hoffman, Al Pacino, and Catherine Zeta-Jones, among many others.

The Drama Desk Awards have contributed to the ongoing success of major stars, playwrights and designers, while also identifying newcomers. The Drama Desk was the first New York theater organization to give awards to talents such as Edward Albee, Wendy Wasserstein, and George C. Scott. Plays like Driving Miss Daisy, Other People's Money, Steel Magnolias, and The Boys in the Band built momentum with the help of Drama Desk wins.

In keeping with its original mission, the organization sponsors guest panel luncheons with theater professionals. Panels address topics of current interest: covering the season on Broadway, Off-Broadway, and Off-Off-Broadway, with the aim of prompting informative and stimulating discussion.

Ceremony

Award categories

Performance categories 

 Outstanding Actress in a Play
 Outstanding Featured Actress in a Play
 Outstanding Actress in a Musical
 Outstanding Featured Actress in a Musical
 Outstanding Actor in a Play
 Outstanding Featured Actor in a Play
 Outstanding Actor in a Musical
 Outstanding Featured Actor in a Musical
 Outstanding Solo Performance

Show and technical categories 

 Outstanding Musical
 Outstanding Revival of a Musical
 Outstanding Director of a Musical
 Outstanding Book of a Musical
 Outstanding Music
 Outstanding Music in a Play
 Outstanding Lyrics
 Outstanding Orchestrations
 Outstanding Choreography
 Outstanding Scenic Design of a Musical
 Outstanding Costume Design of a Musical
 Outstanding Lighting Design for a Musical
 Outstanding Sound Design in a Musical
 Outstanding Play
 Outstanding Revival of a Play
 Outstanding Director of a Play
 Outstanding Scenic Design of a Play
 Outstanding Costume Design of a Play
 Outstanding Lighting Design for a Play
 Outstanding Sound Design in a Play
 Outstanding Wig and Hair Design
 Unique Theatrical Experience
 Outstanding Revue
 Outstanding Projection Design
 Outstanding Puppet Design

Special awards 
 Drama Desk Special Award
  Outstanding Ensemble

Retired awards 

 Outstanding Director
 Outstanding Revival
 Outstanding Set Design
 Outstanding Costume Design
 Outstanding Lighting Design
 Outstanding Sound Design

See also
Other theatre awards in New York:
 Tony Award
 Lucille Lortel Awards
 Obie Award
 New York Drama Critics' Circle
 Drama League Award
 Theatre World Award

References

External links

 
Awards established in 1955
1955 establishments in New York (state)